Amaravathi is a village on the banks of the Krishna River, in the Palnadu district of the Indian state of Andhra Pradesh.

Amaravathi was founded by Raja Vasireddy Venkatadri Nayudu in the 1790s as the new capital of his Zamindari estate. He moved there from his former capital Chintapalli in protest of alleged mistreatment by the British East India Company. Amaravathi is named after the ancient Amaravati Stupa, which was unearthed in the process of the town's construction.
It is adjacent to the ancient Satavahana capital Dhanyakataka (now called Dharanikota).

Amaralingeswara temple in the village is one of the Pancharama Kshetras for Hindus. The place was also a historic Buddhist site, as shown by the presence of Amaravati Stupa built during the second century BCE and the third century CE, as well as the Dhyana Buddha statue, a large 21st-century Buddha statue in Dhyana posture. It is one of the sites selected for the Heritage City Development and Augmentation Yojana (HRIDAY) scheme of Government of India, to preserve the rich cultural heritage of India.

Etymology 

The word Amaravathi translates as the place for immortals. It was also known as Dhanyakataka and Andhranagari.

History 

The recorded history of Amaravathi and nearby Dharanikota dates to the fifth century BCE. It is a town said " a continuous history of at least 2,300 years." It was the capital of Satavahanas who ruled from the third century BCE to the third century CE. After the decline of Satavahanas, Andhra Ikshvakus and later Pallava kings ruled Krishna river valley. Subsequently, Eastern Chalukyas and Telugu Cholas held sway over the region, and it also became the third capital of the Vishnukundina empire. Kota Kings were in control of Amaravathi during the medieval times. Kota kings were subdued by Kakatiyas in the 11th century CE and Amaravathi became part of the unified Telugu empire. The Skanda Purana gives a picture of the place and the Siva temple located here.

Amaravathi was part of Delhi Sultanate, Musunuri Nayaks, Bahmani Sultanate, Vijayanagara Empire, Sultanate of Golconda and Mughal Empire successively before the founding of the Nizam of Hyderabad in 1724. It was ceded to France in 1750 but was captured by England in 1759. Guntur returned to the Nizamate in 1768 but was ceded to England again in 1788. It was briefly occupied by Hyder Ali. It was part of the Madras Presidency during the British colonial period.

The Great Stūpa or Mahācaitya 

The most important historic monument in Amaravathi village is the Mahachaitya. It is protected by the Archaeological Survey of India which maintains a site museum beside the ruins.  In 2006 the Dalai Lama visited and performed Kalachakra Mahasamalanam during the Kalachakra festival.

Geography 

Demographics 

 Census of India, the town had a population of 13,400 with 3,316 households. The total population constitute, 6,432 males and 6,958 females —a sex ratio of 1,082 females per 1,000 males. 1,321 children are in the age group of 0–6 years, of which 647 are boys and 674 are girls —a ratio of 1,042 per 1,000. The average literacy rate stands at 71.34% with 8,617 literates, higher than the state average of 67.41%.

Government and politics 

Amaravathi gram panchayat is the local self-government of the village. It is divided into wards and each ward is represented by a ward member. The village as a part of Amaravathi mandal, represents the Pedakurapadu assembly constituency. The present MLA representing the constituency is Sankara Rao Namburu of YSRCP.

Culture 

The town is a centre of pilgrimage for both Hindus and Buddhists. The inscriptions on the walls of the Amareswara temple depicts the reign of Vasireddy Venkatadri Nayudu who ruled before the advent of British rule. He was well known for his benevolence, munificence and for the construction of a large number of temples and education centres in the Krishna river delta. It also hosts a 125-foot tall statue of the Buddha, known as the Dhyana Buddha. The ancient structures and replicas can be found at Kalachakra museum, which was renamed the Amaravathi Heritage Centre and Museum. The ancient Buddhist stupa and other ruins make up one of the centrally protected Monuments of National Importance. The main Hindu festivals celebrated are Mahasivaratri and the Navaratri. The 30th Kalachakra festival, a popular Buddhist ritual, was held at Amaravathi in the first week of January 2006. It is one of  the oldest tourist places for Buddhists.

Transport 

The only means of connectivity for the village is by road. The Vijayawada–Amaravathi Road connects the village with cities of Vijayawada, Tenali, Guntur, and with the Andhra Pradesh Capital Region areas of Undavalli, Penumaka, Rayapudi. The Guntur–Amaravathi Road connects it with the district headquarters, Guntur. It also has road connectivity from Sattenapalle, Mangalagiri and Krosuru. APSRTC operates buses from major bus stations like NTR bus station in Guntur, Pandit Nehru bus station in Vijayawada and the Tenali bus station. The village has no rail connectivity.

A waterway categorised as class–III is planned from Pulichintala to Prakasam Barrage, which connects the nearby villages of Harishchandrapuram and Vykuntapuram.

Education 

As per the school information report for the academic year 2018–19, the village has a total of 17 schools. These schools include 4 MPP, one KGBV and 12 private schools.

See also 
 List of villages in Guntur district

References

Bibliography

External links 

Buddhist pilgrimage sites in India
Villages in Guntur district
Mandal headquarters in Guntur district
Tourist attractions in Guntur district
Archaeological sites in Andhra Pradesh
Ancient Indian cities
Hindu holy cities
Former capital cities in India
Villages in Palnadu district